The 221st Security Division was a rear-area security division in the Wehrmacht during World War II. Commanded by General Johann Pflugbeil, the unit was deployed in German-occupied areas of the Soviet Union, in the Army Group Centre Rear Area, for security and Bandenbekämpfung ("anti-bandit") duties. It was responsible for large-scale war crimes and atrocities including the deaths of thousands of Soviet civilians.

Operational history

Formation and Operation Barbarossa
The division was formed in June 1941. Along with Wehrmacht army troops, it included Police Battalion 309 of the Orpo (uniformed police), its only motorised formation. The unit spent three months at the front and six months on rear-area security duties in the Gomel area. Its duties included ensuring the security of communications and supply lines, economic exploitation and combatting partisans in the Wehrmacht's rear areas.

In September 1941, the officers of the division attended the Mogilev conference, organised by General Max von Schenckendorff, commander of Army Group Centre Rear Area. The conference, while ostensibly on "anti-partisan training", resulted in a dramatic increase in atrocities against Jews and other civilians in the last three months of 1941. The division reported shooting 1,847 "partisans" in two months alone. Hostage-taking also increased dramatically. Wehrmacht units were receiving directives that 50 to 100 "communists" were to be killed as atonement for the death of each German soldier.

Activities in 1942
In March 1942, the division embarked on large-scale Nazi security warfare operations in the Yelnya-Dorogobuzh area east of Smolensk. The so-called anti-partisan operations in "bandit-infested" areas amounted to destruction of villages, seizure of livestock, deportation of the able-bodied population for slave labour to Germany and murder of those of non-working age. The tactics included shelling villages not under German control with heavy weapons, resulting in mass civilian casualties. General Johann Pflugbeil directed his troops that the "goal of the operation is not to drive the enemy back, but to exterminate him". During the operation, the unit recorded 278 German troops killed, while 806 enemies were reported killed in action and 120 prisoners were handed over to Wehrmacht's Secret Field Police for execution. Only 200 weapons (rifles, machine-guns and pistols) were seized.

Later history
The division saw brief front-line duty in October 1943 fighting the Soviet Red Army troops at Gomel. In November, it was again transferred to rear-security duties (Bandenbekämpfung) in Belarus. The unit was largely destroyed during the Soviet Red Army summer offensive, Operation Bagration, in June 1944. The surviving personnel were absorbed into other security units.

See also
 War crimes of the Wehrmacht

References

Citations

Bibliography

Further reading
 
 
 

Military units and formations established in 1941
1941 establishments in Germany
Military units and formations disestablished in 1944
Security divisions of Germany during World War II
War crimes of the Wehrmacht